The Panjnad River (Punjabi and ) is a river at the extreme end of Bahawalpur district in Punjab, Pakistan. The name Panjnad means "five rivers", from Sanskrit pancha ("five") and nadī́ ("river").The Panjnad River is formed by successive confluence or merger of the five rivers of the Punjab, namely Jhelum, Chenab, Ravi, Beas and Sutlej. 

Jhelum and Ravi join Chenab, Beas joins Sutlej, and then Sutlej and Chenab join to form Panjnad, 10 miles north of Uch Sharif in Muzaffar Garh district. The combined stream runs southwest for approximately 44 miles and joins the Indus River at Mithankot. The Indus Rver continues and then drains into the Arabian Sea. A barrage on Panjnad has been erected; it provides irrigation channels for Punjab and Sindh provinces south of the Sutlej and east of the Indus rivers.

Beyond the confluence of the Indus and Panjnad rivers, the Indus River was known as Satnad (Sat = seven) carrying the waters of seven rivers including the Indus River, the five Punjab rivers, and the Kabul River.

References

See also 
 Panjnad
 Topography of Pakistan

Rivers of Punjab (Pakistan)
Tributaries of the Indus River
Rivers of Pakistan